The Order of the Cross of Takovo was a Serbian state order.

History
It was instituted in the Principality of Serbia in 1865 to mark the 50th anniversary of the Second Serbian Uprising against the Ottoman Empire, which had started in Takovo, Serbia.

The decree that established the Cross and Silver Medal was signed on 22 May 1865 by Mihailo Obrenović III, Prince of Serbia. The Order was suppressed in 1903.

Notable recipients 

 Albert I of Belgium
 Archduke Albrecht, Duke of Teschen
 Alexander of Battenberg
 Alfred, Duke of Saxe-Coburg and Gotha
 Baudouin of Belgium
 Jovan Belimarković
 Petar Bojović
 Count Otto von Bray-Steinburg
 Vlaho Bukovac
 Mikhail Chernyayev
 Dimitrije Cincar-Marković
 Nićifor Dučić
 Dimitrije Đurić
 Grand Duke Dmitry Konstantinovich of Russia
 Ernest II, Duke of Saxe-Coburg and Gotha
 Ernst I, Duke of Saxe-Altenburg
 Gaston Errembault de Dudzeele (died 1929)
 Géza Fejérváry
 Franz Joseph I of Austria
 Frederick III, German Emperor
 Jevrem Grujić
 Iosif Gurko
 Wilhelm von Hahnke
 Paul von Hatzfeldt
 David Edward Hughes
 Sima Igumanov
 Paulina Irby
 Nikola Ivanov
 Joachim III of Constantinople
 Count Gustav Kálnoky
 John Mākini Kapena
 Gustav von Kessel
 Konstantin of Hohenlohe-Schillingsfürst
 Hermann Kövess von Kövessháza
 Franz Kuhn von Kuhnenfeld
 Leopold II of Belgium
 Prince Leopold of Bavaria
 Louis IV, Grand Duke of Hesse
 Archduke Ludwig Viktor of Austria
 Luís I of Portugal
 Aleksandar Mašin
 Charles McLaren, 1st Baron Aberconway
 Čedomilj Mijatović
 Milan I of Serbia
 Milan Milićević
 Prince Mirko of Montenegro
 Živojin Mišić
 Dumitru C. Moruzi
 Nicholas I of Montenegro

 Artur Nepokoychitsky
 Petar Perunović
 Racho Petrov
 Constantin Poenaru
 Constantin Prezan
 Radomir Putnik
 Alexander Arkadyevich Suvorov
 Dmitry Milyutin
 Eduard Totleben
 Fyodor Keller
 Fyodor Radetsky
 Fyodor Trepov (senior)
 Grand Duke Nicholas Nikolaevich of Russia (1856–1929)
 Grand Duke Vladimir Alexandrovich of Russia
 Illarion Vorontsov-Dashkov
 Kalākaua
 Konstantin von Stackelberg
 Mikhail Annenkov
 Mikhail Dragomirov
 Nikolai Obruchev
 Terty Filippov
 Viktor Sakharov
 Rudolf, Crown Prince of Austria
 Mikhail Skobelev
 Leonid Solarević
 Stepa Stepanović
 Rudolf Stöger-Steiner von Steinstätten
 Dejan Subotić
 Eduard Taaffe, 11th Viscount Taaffe
 Queen Victoria
 Sergei Witte
 Pavel Zelenoy

Gallery

Description
Elements of the decoration of the Order of the mark and the stars:

Order insignia

External links
ORDER OF THE CROSS OF TAKOVO (Orden takovskog krsta - Орден таковског крста)
The Order of the Cross of Takovo
The Order of the Cross of Takovol
Serbian star awards by type

References

Cross of Takovo
 
Awards established in 1865

Orders, decorations, and medals of the Principality of Serbia
Orders, decorations, and medals of the Kingdom of Serbia